{{Infobox football league season
  | competition        = Ukrainian Second League
  | season             = 2004–05
  | winners            = FC Rava Rava-RuskaFC Krymteplitsia MolodizhneFC Helios Kharkiv
  | relegated          = 
  | league topscorer   = 20 – Oleksandr Kozhemyachenko (Desna Chernihiv)
  | biggest home win   = 
  | biggest away win   = 
  | highest scoring    = 
  | total goals        = 
  | average goals      = 
  | longest wins       = 
  | longest unbeaten   = 
  | longest losses     = 
  | highest attendance = 
  | lowest attendance  = 
  | average attendance = 
  | prevseason         = 2003–04
  | nextseason         = 2005–06
}}

The 2004–05 Ukrainian Second League was the 14th season of 3rd level professional football in Ukraine.

The competitions were divided into three groups according to geographical location in the country – A is western Ukraine, B is southern Ukraine and Crimea, and C is eastern Ukraine.

 Team changes 
 Promoted 
The following team was promoted from the 2004 Ukrainian Football Amateur League:
 FC Bershad – (returning after an absence of 6 seasons, previously as Nyva Bershad) Hirnyk Kryvyi Rih – (debut) Real Odessa – (debut) Olimpik Donetsk – (debut)The 2003 Ukrainian Football Amateur League participant:
 Molniya Severodonetsk – (debut, replaced Avanhard-Inter Rovenky)Also, three more clubs were admitted:
 PFC Oleksandriya – (returning after an absence of 1 season) Fakel Ivano-Frankivsk – (debut) MFC Oleksandria – (debut) Relegated 
From the First League
 Karpaty-2 Lviv – (returning for the first time after the club's reorganization in 2001, previously as FC Lviv (1992) in 1994–95) Osvita Borodyanka – (returning after an absence of 2 seasons, previously as Systema-Boreks Borodianka)From the Top League
 Zirka Kirovohrad – (returning after an absence of 10 seasons)''

Withdrawn 
 FC Podillya Khmelnytskyi, merged with FC Krasyliv as Podillya Khmelnytskyi
 FC Avanhard Rovenky
 FC Vodnyk Mykolaiv
 FC Elektron Romny

Some second teams were withdrawn to reform into reserve teams to compete in separate competitions:
 FC Borysfen-2 Boryspil
 FC Kryvbas-2 Kryvyi Rih
 FC Chornomorets-2 Odesa
 FC Dnipro-2 Dnipropetrovsk
 FC Metalurh-2 Donetsk
 FC Arsenal-2 Kyiv
 FC Karpaty-Halychyna Lviv

Name change 
 Osvita Borodyanka was previously known as Boreks-Borysfen
 FC Dnipro Cherkasy was known as FC Cherkasy

Changed groups 
 Hirnyk-Sport Komsomolsk from Group B to C
 FC Cherkasy from Group B to C

Group A

Location map

Final Standings

Expelled teams 
On March 29, 2005 Spartak-2 Kalush after failing to pay license fees for the second half of the season the PFL expelled them from the competition. Their record at that time was 6 wins, 2 draws, 6 losses, and 17-12 goal difference.

Top goalscorers

Group B

Location map

Final Standings

Top goalscorers

Group C

Location map

Final Standings

Top goalscorers

See also 
 2004–05 Ukrainian Premier League
 2004–05 Ukrainian First League
 2004–05 Ukrainian Cup

References

External links 
  2004-05 Second League season by Oleksiy Kobyzev

Ukrainian Second League seasons
3
Ukra